Graham Coop (born 23 May 1979) is a British-American population geneticist. He is a professor in both the Department of Evolution and Ecology and the Center for Population Biology in the College of Biological Sciences at the University of California, Davis.

References

External links
Lab website
Faculty page

British emigrants to the United States
Living people
1979 births
American geneticists
Population geneticists
Alumni of the University of Oxford
University of California, Davis faculty